Donny Alamsyah (born 7 December 1978) is an Indonesian actor, best known internationally for his role in action films Merantau (2009) and The Raid (2011). He became well known in Indonesia for his appearance in the 2006 criminal drama film 9 Naga.

Early life and martial arts 
Donny was born in Jakarta on 7 December 1978. He had started practicing martial arts since he was a kid. His father, who is a pencak silat Cimande trainer, motivates 4-years-old Donny to learn martial arts. He later learned various martial arts to find something that would fit him. While he was an elementary schooler, he learned karate. In junior high school, he took up kung fu. During high school days, he learned Muay Thai, then continue to Wing Chun, wrestling, boxing, and aikido.

Career 
His acting career began when he starred the film Gie (2005), which is also played by Nicholas Saputra. In 2004, he often accompanied a friend who went to casting calls in Gie film. In the end, he was asked to join in the film and get a role in it. His second film, 9 Naga, essentially cemented his reputation as a promising actor. Since then, he has received many casting calls. He starred several action films that require him to compete, such as Merah Putih, Merantau, Darah Garuda and The Raid. He also starred in several music videos from Ungu, Ari Lasso, Andra and The BackBone and many others. He was nominated for Best Actor category in the 2008 Indonesian Film Festival for his role as Bari (a writer) in Fiksi film, losing to Vino G. Bastian (Radit dan Jani).

Personal life 
He married Putri Anggiareni on 5 June 2009. The couple have one child.

Filmography

Film

Television series

Awards and nominations

References

External links 
 
 
 Donny Alamsyah on Instagram

1978 births
Action choreographers
Betawi people
Indonesian male film actors
Indonesian Muslims
Living people
Male actors from Jakarta
Silat practitioners